Song of the Season is a studio album by guitarist Peter White, released in 1997 by Columbia Records. The album reached #13 on the Billboard Jazz Albums chart.

Overview
Kenny Lattimore and Dee Harvey performed backing vocals on "River" and "Silent Night" respectively.

Track listing

References

1997 Christmas albums
Christmas albums by English artists
Columbia Records Christmas albums
Jazz Christmas albums